This is a list of organizations and institutions of professional sexologists, sex researchers, and sexual behavior scientists.  These do not include organizations of non-professionals, political advocacy or activist groups (although some organizations may engage in some advocacy as one of their activities), self-help or social groups, groups of enthusiasts for a topic in sexology, or websites unassociated with any actual organization or institution.  These organizations and institutions are recognized by their local governments (such as by incorporation) or are administrative units within a larger organization that is.

Professional organizations
American Academy of Clinical Sexology
American Association of Sex Educators, Counselors, & Therapists (AASECT)
 American Board of Sexology (ABS)
 Association for the Treatment of Sexual Abusers (ATSA)
Brazilian association of Human Sexuality
British Association for Sexual and Relationship Therapy (BASRT) 
Canadian Federation for Sexual Health
Canadian Sex Research Forum
European Federation of Sexology
European Society of Sexual Medicine (ESSM)
Flemish Society of Sexology
German Society for Social-Scientific Sexuality Research
Indian Institute of Sexology Bhubaneswar
Institute for Advanced Study of Human Sexuality
Institute of Family and Sexuality Studies
International Academy of Sex Research (IASR) 
 International Association of Sexual Medicine (IAS-M) 
International Association for the Study of Sexuality, Culture and Society (IASSCS)
International Association for the Treatment of Sexual Offenders (IATSO)
International Institute for Trauma and Addiction Professionals (IITAP), for the treatment of sex addiction
International Online Sexology Supervisors (IOSS), Online Sexology Education]]
International Society for Sexual Medicine (ISSM)
International Society for the Study of Women's Sexual Health (ISSWSH)
Latin American Institute of Somatic Sexology (ILASS)
 Magnus Hirschfeld Archive of Sexology at the Humboldt University of Berlin
National Association for the Treatment of Abusers (NOTA)
Sexology SA & The Academy for Sexology
South Asia Institute for Human Sexuality
 Sexuality Information and Education Council of the United States (SIECUS)
Society of Australian Sexologists
Society for Sex Therapy and Research (SSTAR)
Society for the Psychological Study of Lesbian, Gay, and Bisexual Issues
Society for the Advancement of Sexual Health
 Society for the Scientific Study of Sexuality (SSSS)
 World Professional Association for Transgender Health (WPATH) (Previously, the Harry Benjamin International Gender Dysphoria Association)

Research Institutions
Kinsey Institute for Research in Sex, Gender and Reproduction; Bloomington, Indiana, USA
 Kurt Freund Laboratory; Toronto, Canada

References

See also
Sexology
List of academic journals in sexology

Sexology